Destiny is the fourth regular studio album by all-female German pop group No Angels, released by Polydor Records and Universal Music Domestic on 13 April 2007 in German-speaking Europe. A comeback release, it marked the return of No Angels after the group had gone into hiatus in autumn 2003, which allowed each member to launch solo careers. Primarily produced by production duo Twin, with additional contribution from Jiant, Max Martin, Adrian Newman, and Thorsten Brötzmann as well as several new producers, it was the first album to feature No Angels's third lineup, excluding original band member Vanessa Petruo.

Recorded at the Sound Studio N in Cologne within a period of a few weeks only, Destiny is composed of uptempo songs and ballads that are subsequent continuations of the band's previous material such as Now... Us! (2002) and Pure (2003). A pop album, it combines pop rock with elements of contemporary R&B and dance music. Lyrically, it includes themes of friendship, monogamous love and relationship issues. Destiny was released to generally mixed to negative reviews from music critics, many of whom praised the band for their vocal performances but found the material too generic and cliché-addled.

On the charts, Destiny became the band's first album to miss the top of the German Albums Chart, peaking at number four. It also reached number fourteen and number twenty-two in Austria and Switzerland respectively, barely selling 30,000 copies within the first three months of release. Altogether, the album spawned five singles, including "Goodbye to Yesterday" and "Maybe", the ballad "Amaze Me", the Womack & Womack cover "Teardrops" and the German ESC entry "Disappear". Previously unreleased, latter two appeared on a re-release edition of the album, branded Destiny Reloaded and released on 14 March 2008.

Background
In September 2003, amid the release of their third album Pure, the remaining four band members of No Angels announced their separation in favor of a break following three years of intense touring, recording and promotional obligations. Shortly after releasing a compilation album, The Best of No Angels (2003), they disbanded and launched solo careers in music, film, theatre, and television with varying success. In 2006, after listening to live recordings from their first two concert tours, Lucy Diakovska wondered if her former bandmates were open to a reunion and reached out to them individually. While Nadja Benaissa, Sandy Mölling, and Jessica Wahls responded gladly to her idea, fifth member Vanessa Petruo declined to meet with her former colleagues to discuss a permanent reformation due to her commitments as an independent solo artist. However, Petruo later made an appearance in the two-part ProSieben documentary We Love No Angels (2007) in which she wished them well on their plans to reunite as a quartet.

Since Mölling was putting the final touches on her second solo album Frame of Mind, which was expected to be released in May 2006, the announcement of their reformation plans as well as the recording of new material were postponed until 2007. Meanwhile, the quartet met with their former vocal coach Nik Hafemann and Holger Roost-Macias, producer of the first installment of the Popstars series in which they were formed, at the Radisson Blu hotel in Frankfurt am Main to make plans on their comeback. With Roost-Macias's ideas clashing with their visions of a reunion though, they unanimously rejected his offer to collaborate with him again, and in a second meeting without him, Benaissa, Diakovska, Mölling, and Wahls decided on resuming work without him, while acquiring the rights to their band name which were still hold by their former label Cheyenne Records, an affiliated company of Roost-Macias's Tresor TV production company that had produced the Popstars series for the RTL II network.

Conception and production 
Following their split from Roost-Marcias and his management team, the band members began managing themselves. Hafemann would remain a key part of their musical endeavors and take over executive producer duties on their then-untitled next studio album. Around the turn of the year 2006/2007, the group signed a recording contract with the Domestic Pop division of Universal Music and met with several Scandinavian musicians in Stockholm where they were presented pre-existing songs for potential inclusion on their new projects. While each band member had written or pre-recorded demo songs for a new album, they eventually decided not to record self-written material as Benaissa, Diakovska, Mölling, and Wahls found themselves struggling to find a stylistic main thread within their own songs. Instead, the band focused on collecting and selecting adaptable songs with a "typical but contemporary No Angels sound", of which some were penned exclusively for the group by various songwriters from Sweden, England, and Australia.

Production was provided by a large group of Scandinavian producers, including Tobias Gustafsson, Michel Zitron, Ivar Lisinski, Vincent Pontare, and Arnthor Birgisson, as well as Ulf Lindström and Johan Ekhé from duo Ghost. In addition, the band reteamed with Thorsten Brötzmann and Joachim Persson and Niclas Molinder from duo Twin, all of which had contributed to earlier projects. Both Peter Ries and Leslie Mándoki, also frequent collaborators during the years 2001 to 2003, were not consulted. Recording began in January 2007 at the Sound Studio N in Cologne where the band spent ten days to record the first half of the album. All vocals were recorded simultaneously in two studios and control rooms to meet the deadline, with in-house studio engineers Nico Schütte and Tobias Eichelberg overseeing the process. Interrupted by several promotional appearances following the official announcement of their reunion the same month, recording sessions for the second half of the album took place in late February 2007.

Music and title
Most songs on Destiny were contributed by Niclas Molinder and Joacim Persson from Swedish procution team Twin, including the album's opening track and first single "Goodbye to Yesterday" which was an eleventh-hour addition to Destinys recording listing. The duo's other offerings on the album include guitar-driven uptempo song "Back Off", which critics compared to Destiny's Child's 2001 song "Survivor", as well as the album's second single "Maybe", a cover version of Norwegian singer Trine Rein's Melodi Grand Prix 2007 entry that is built around an uncredited sample of The Beatles' 1969 number-one record "Come Together". Twin, along with GrooveFactory, also co-produced "A Reason", a remake of the same-titled Dana Glover which has been described as a highbrow track, comprising a complex musical mixture by the likes of Tori Amos and Amanda Marshall. Steve Mac and Karen Poole contributed to "Amaze Me", a pulasting hymn-like pop ballad, while newcomer Adrian Newman produced the spheric mid-tempo ballad "What If". Another ballad, "The Rhythm of My Heart", saw the band reteaming with Thorsten Brötzmann, who had previously produced three number-one singles for them.

Tim Hawes and Pete Kirtley from British production duo Jiant provided co-production on the piano-led ballad "Make a Change", an English language cover of the 2003 song "Reste Encore", recorded by French girl band and fellow Popstars winners L5 and initially produced by Fred Fraikin. No Angels's favourite song on Destiny, it was one of the first songs assuredly to be included on the album alongside dark ballad "Misguided Heart", another Jiant contribution, and "I Don't Wanna Talk About It". Production on the latter was overseen by Ivar Lisinski and David Clewett who also worked on the song "Secret's Out" that mixes soft rock and contemporary R&B elements. The quartet also collaborated with Swedish production team Ghost on "I Believe in You", and Arnthor Birgisson and Max Martin on "I Had a Feeling", both being remakes of the same-titled songs on Swedish singer Agnes Carlsson's 2006 album Stronger. As reported, "I Had a Feeling" occupied the longest work until complementation. Uptempo dance track "Been Here Before" was written and produced by Itchycoo band members Tobias Gustafsson and Mia Bergström and features distorted vocals. With an instrumentation that includes a pounding bass beat, electronic chords, and drum machine sounds, it has been described as the most experimental as well as the sexiest record on the album.

Thirteen out of a total of sixteen tracks made it to the final track listing of the standard album, while "Ain't Gonna Look the Other Way" and "Secret's Out" served a B-sides and were later included on the reissue of Destiny. Musically, No Angels have described the album as "more of a continuation" of earlier projects instead of a musical reorientation in the course of the reunion. Therefore, they decided to include "powerful up-tempo songs, beat-driven tracks and empathic ballads" which they considered similar to their pre-disbandment releases. However, although incorporating elements of rock, soul and dance music, the songs are mainly affected by keyboards and string instruments. When asked about the album's lyrics and their tendency to post-break up issues, Benaissa commented: "I'd say, we're offering a broad range [of topics] with different directions [...] We just chose [the songs] for their statements, their energy and the feeling." Although the quartet had several titles for the album in mind at one time or another, including "platitudinous und boring names such as Comeback, Reunion, Chapter Four and New Beginning", the title of the longplayer was actually inspired by a demo recording for the album, named "Destiny Calls". The record failed to make the cut on the final track listing, but widely served as a metaphor for the band's "emotional relation" to the band.

Critical response 

Destiny received a mixed to negative reception from music critics, many of whom praised their vocal performances but found the material too generic and cliché-addled. Nana Heyman of Der Tagesspiegel complimented their effort and called Destiny a "solid pop album, well-produced, with no frills. But above all: Not larmoyant. After all that happened three and a half years ago, you could have expected that." Astrid Weist, writing for Musicheadquarter.de, noted that "the album proves that they have found their own style and developed it consistently." She found that while Destiny "offers no big surprises, except it may be more rocking than usual for the girls [...] the musical mix is quite balanced. The great voices of Sandy, Lucy, Jessica and Nadja sound wonderful in the solo passages and complement each other well in the polyphonic choruses – to a dense sound." Weist rated Destiny seven out of nine stars.

T-Online found that Destiny offers "solid girl band sound with isolated highlights" and wrote that the songs "sound familiar yet new. Vocally, all four have matured, but stylistically they re-start exactly where they left at the end of 2003 [...] And maybe that's just the problem: There is no big hit, no mega-hit for their furious comeback." The news portal felt that "many songs remain quite colorless, which is mainly due to the good, but also very smooth and styled production of the songs. For the most part, they lack surprises as well as creative and innovative moments." Laut.de journalist Katja Scherle declared the album a "girl power collage of the last fifteen years", and compared the sound on Destiny with the Spice Girls and Destiny's Child. She noted that "the new pieces are lush and instrumentally rich [and] feature No Angels-typical big chorus [..] Whether this is too much of the glitter produced, depends on the personal pathos preference. What you definitely can not deny is No Angels's vocal art: Now and then they fit wonderful together. And that's probably what brought the girls back together: The joy of singing."

Anton Tsuji from CDStarts.de wrote that "the problem with No Angels has always been that a lot of fillers hide between a handful of good to decent songs – and Destiny is no exception." He believed to recognize semi-plagiarism on songs such as "Been Here Before" and "Make a Change" which he considered ripoffs of Justin Timberlake's "SexyBack" and En Vogue's "Don't Let Go" and added: "As much as one would wish for the four remaining Angels, they certainly did not shoot down the bird with their comeback. The bottom line is a pretty mediocre album." Ruth Schneeberger und Jürgen Schmieder, writers for Süddeutsche Zeitung, noted that "listening to the album feels like chewing on an old Hubba Bubba, that is to squeezed to produce more bubbles." Highly critical with the album lyrics, they found that "every song sounds like the other: Probably the drum computer was broken, because it always plays the same beat [...] Everything is heartache [and] the drama is sighed for but the music sounds more like a boring autumn afternoon than a real emotion." In her ironic review for Die Welt, Johanna Merhof wrote that Destiny "sounds lovely. Like it was produced yesterday. Like created at the executive's office. Like a wet firecracker.

Commercial performance 
Released on 13 April 2007, Destiny debuted and peaked at number four in Germany, number 14 in Austria and number 22 in Switzerland in the week ending 27 April 2007. It became the band's first regular studio album neither to reach the top position on the German Albums Chart nor to enter the top ten in Austria and Switzerland. Billboard ranked the album fourteenth on its European Top 100 Albums chart. By June 2007, Destiny had sold about 30,000 copies domestically. While plans for a Special Winter Edition of the album were eventually scrapped, both a Limited Pur Edition, containing the previously unreleased single "Disappear", and a Reloaded edition of the album, featuring previously unreleased remixes, b-sides, and a second disc with exclusive footage, were released on 14 March 2008. Destiny re-entered the German Albums Chart at number 75 in the following week.

Although the group was aware that any placement other than number one would be interpreted as a commercial flop by the media, they were disappointed when their record company confirmed the impression by giving the band the choice of participating in the German pre-selection for the Eurovision Song Contest 2008 or being dropped. When asked about the underperformance of the album, Sandy Mölling admitted in a 2008 interview with Autona magazine that she would have re-worked the promotional strategy for the album following the mediocre success of the Destiny: "I love this album very much [but] the only thing I'd fault is the lack of courage [we had] when it came to selection of the singles. The album contains a lot more stronger songs, which would have been more daring [to the audience] probably." Lucy Diakovska, also blaming the band's lack of courage for Destinys underperformance, further acknowledged in an interview with Hamburger Abendblatt the following year: "In music, it's dangerous to do the same thing again and again." In her 2010 autobiography Alles wird gut, Nadja Benaissa expressed her dislike of the album when she noted that follow-up Welcome to the Dance (2009) was the first No Angels project whose sound she supported wholeheartedly.

Singles
While Mölling and Benaissa initially favored "Back Off" to be released as the first single from Destiny, No Angels and their label eventually settled on the Redfly-penned mid-tempo ballad "Goodbye to Yesterday" to lead the album. Their first release after a three years absence from the charts, it reached number four on the German Singles Chart, and peaked within the top 20 in Switzerland and the top 30 in Austria. On 6 April 2007, it was announced that either "I Believe in You", "Been Here Before", "Maybe", or "I Had a Feeling" would be the next single from Destiny and Universal Music started an online poll asking the fans to decide. "Maybe", a Trine Rein cover, eventually won over piano-laid "I Believe in You", and was released on 15 June 2007. The song failed to chart in Switzerland and debuted and peaked at number 36 in Germany, becoming the band's lowest-charting single there, selling less than 15,000 copies up to then.

In October 2007, a third single, consisting of the hymn-like ballad "Amaze Me" and a previously unreleased, synth-heavy cover of American duo Womack & Womack's 1988 song "Teardrops" was released. The double A-single for which the band filmed two music videos, debuted and peaked at number 25 in Germany.
Although expected to produce a fourth single, no further song from Destiny received single treatment. However, their previously unreleased 2008 song "Disappear", which served as Germany's entry for the 53rd Eurovision Song Contest 2008 in Belgrade and reached number four on the German Singles Chart, was later included on the Destiny Reloaded reissue of the album. It became the band's biggest-selling single during their reformation years, also reaching the top 30 of the Hungarian Airplay Chart and number 21 on Billboards Eurochart Hot 100 Singles.

Track listing

Destiny Reloaded 

Notes
  signifies a co-producer
  signifies an additional producer

Sampling credits 
 "I Believe in You" contains an uncredited sample of Supertramp's "Breakfast in America"; is a cover of Agnes' song from her 2006 album Stronger
 "Maybe" contains an uncredited sample of The Beatles' 1969 record "Come Together"; is a cover of Trine Rein's 2006 song
 "I Had a Feeling" is a cover of Agnes' song from her 2006 album Stronger
 "Make a Change" is an English-language cover of French girl band L5's song "Reste Encore" from their 2002 album Retiens-Moi
 "A Reason" is a cover of Dana Glover's song from her 2002 album Testimony
 "Teardrops" is a cover of Womack & Womack's 1988 single from their album Conscience
 "Ain't Gonna Look the Other Way" is a cover of Celine Dion's 2004 song from her live album A New Day... Live in Las Vegas

Charts

Weekly charts

Release history

References

External links

No Angels albums
2007 albums
Albums produced by Twin
Albums produced by Ghost (production team)
Polydor Records albums